Vito J. Kubilus (June 29, 1914 – November 16, 1986) was an American professional basketball player. He played in the National Basketball League for the Cleveland Chase Brassmen during the 1943–44 season and averaged 2.0 points per game. He had served as the team's head coach for the first two-thirds of the season before Bill Brownell took over the responsibility. Kubilus stayed on the team as a player.

References

1914 births
1986 deaths
American men's basketball players
Basketball players from New York City
Cleveland Chase Brassmen coaches
Cleveland Chase Brassmen players
Cleveland Rosenblums players
Guards (basketball)
John Carroll Blue Streaks men's basketball coaches
Kent State University alumni